Medicine Hat Catholic Separate Regional Division No. 20 or Medicine Hat Catholic Board of Education is a separate school authority within the Canadian province of Alberta operated out of Medicine Hat.

See also 
List of school authorities in Alberta

References

External links 

 
Medicine Hat
School districts in Alberta